Ahmet Fevzi Big  or Ahmet Fevzi Paşa (1871-1947) was an Ottoman commander of the Ninth Army Corps of the Ottoman Third Army. He was an Abkhazian immigrant from Düzce. He was from the Circassian Big family. His father's name was Yakub.

Career 
After the Kuva-i Inzibatiye forces loyal to the Ottoman Government were defeated by Çerkes Ethem's forces in the Revolt of Ahmet Anzavur, he was sent to recruit Circassians for the nationalist Kuva-yi Milliye. His efforts to persuade Circassians around the South Marmara towns of Manyas and Gönen were largely unsuccessful. He later told Kâzım Özalp that the people of Manyas were waiting for an opportunity to launch a second rebellion.

The XI Corps began the Ottoman Third Army's offensive in the Caucasus Campaign on 7 November. On 12 November they were joined by reinforcements from the IX corps commanded by Fevzi Paşa. Together they were able to push the Russians back.

Behaeddin Shakir was unable to bring the IX Corps under the control Committee of Union and Progress (CUP) while Fevzi Paşa remained their commander. When Fevzi Paşa opposed the Ottoman plan to attack the Russians during the winter, Shakir replaced Fevzi Paşa as IX Corps commander.

Although he was appointed the commander of the XX Corps in place of Ali Fuad Pasha, he refused it at the caution of Rauf Bey and Bekir Sami Bey.

Fevzi Pasha died in 1947 in Istanbul.

References

1871 births
1947 deaths
People from Düzce
Ottoman Military Academy alumni
Turkish people of Ubykh descent
Ottoman military personnel of the Balkan Wars
Ottoman Army generals
Ottoman military personnel of World War I
Turkish people of Circassian descent